Gibborim may refer to:

 Gibborim (biblical), "Mighty Ones" in the Tanakh
 Gibborim (comics), villainous entities from the comic book series Runaways

See also 
 Names of God in Judaism